Marlbert Pradd Jr. (November 17, 1944 – April 27, 2014) was an American basketball player. After a standout college basketball career with Dillard University, he played professionally in the American Basketball Association (ABA) as a member of the New Orleans Buccaneers from 1967 to 1969.

Early life
Pradd was born in Chicago, Illinois. He spent his childhood as a resident of Altgeld Garden housing projects. He attended Carver High School.

Basketball career
Pradd attended Dillard University where he was a NAIA All-American in from 1965 to 1967 and made the All-Gulf Coast Conference team from 1964 to 1965. He averaged 34.3 points in 19 games as a freshman and 35.4 points in 27 games during his sophomore season. He led the NAIA in scoring during his junior season, averaging 39.1 points in 20 games. During his senior season, he averaged 42.0 points per game. He finished his career as the leading scorer in Dillard history, with 2,907 points for a 37.5 average. He was subsequently drafted by the Chicago Bulls during the sixth round of the 1967 NBA draft. In May 1967, he signed with New Orleans Buccaneers of the American Basketball Association. He played two seasons for the Buccaneers before being waived in September 1969. In 2003, he was selected to the Louisiana Basketball Hall of Fame.

References

Notes

External links

1944 births
2014 deaths
American men's basketball players
Chicago Bulls draft picks
Dillard Bleu Devils basketball players
Los Angeles Lakers draft picks
New Orleans Buccaneers players
Shooting guards
Basketball players from Chicago